Running Water (foaled 1903  at Runnymede Farm near Paris, Kentucky) was an American Champion Thoroughbred racemare.

Breeding
Running Water was sired by the 1888 Belmont Stakes winner Sir Dixon who also sired 1905 Kentucky Derby winner Agile and the good filly, Blue Girl. Running Water's mare was Breakwater whose sire was Hindoo, a three-time U.S. Champion, the 1881 Kentucky Derby winner and a U.S. Racing Hall of Fame
inductee.

Racing career
Owned and trained by Woodford Clay, he raced Running Water at age two and for most of her three-year-old season until selling her on August 8, 1906 to trainer Thomas Welsh and the Newcastle Stable, a racing and breeding partnership made up of Andrew Miller, Francis R. Bishop and Blair Painter.

The American Co-Champion Three-Year-Old Filly of 1906, Running Water had a redoubtable career in Thoroughbred racing during which she won top races against the best competition including beating male opponents on a regular basis. In winning the Merchants and Citizens Handicap she set a new Saratoga Race Course track record while beating the highly touted John Madden-trained colt Dandelion as well as Preakness Stakes and Brooklyn Derby winner Cairngorm. In the Saratoga Cup, run at a distance of a mile and three-quarters, she defeated the likes of Travers Stakes winner Frank Gill and Suburban Handicap winner Nealon.

Broodmare in France
Due to the Hart–Agnew Law, racing was shut down in all of New York state in 1911 and 1912. As a result, in 1910 Running Water had to be sent to American Herman Duryea's Haras du Gazon stud farm in Bazoches-au-Houlme in France so she could be bred. Running Water's French-born offspring included Boyne, Breakwater, Mayflower, Pierre Qui Roule, Rappahannock, Reprise, Rochebelle, and Runlad.

Pedigree

References

1903 racehorse births
American racehorses
American Champion racehorses
Thoroughbred family 2-c
Racehorses bred in Kentucky
Racehorses trained in the United States